Myrsina is a village and a community of the Grevena municipality. Before the 2011 local government reform it was a part of the municipality of Grevena, of which it was a municipal district. The 2011 census recorded 263 residents in the village and 343 residents in the community. The community of Myrsina covers an area of 25.494 km2.

Administrative division
The community of Myrsina consists of two separate settlements: 
Asprokampos (population 80)
Myrsina (population 263)
The aforementioned population figures are as of 2011.

Population
According to the 2011 census, the population of the settlement of Myrsina was 263 people, almost the same population figure to that of the previous census of 2001. The respective community had a small population decrease of 9%.

See also
 List of settlements in the Grevena regional unit

References

Populated places in Grevena (regional unit)
Villages in Greece